Nicolás Reyero Manrique (1902 – 16 September 1983) was a Mexican fencer. He competed in the team sabre event at the 1932 Summer Olympics.

References

External links
 

1902 births
1983 deaths
Mexican male sabre fencers
Fencers from Mexico City
Olympic fencers of Mexico
Fencers at the 1932 Summer Olympics
20th-century Mexican people